Milan Blagojevic (born 24 December 1969 in Sydney, New South Wales) is an Australian retired soccer player.

Early life 
Milan is of Serbian descent and always aspired to be a professional footballer. He attended Cabramatta High School in the eighties before becoming a professional after stints with Serbian-Australian club Avala now known as Bonnyrigg White Eagles.

Playing career 
During a long and distinguished professional career, Blagojevic made 31 appearances (19 in official FIFA matches) for the Socceroos, 255 National Soccer League appearances as well as playing overseas for Germinal Ekeren (Belgium), SC Heerenveen (Netherlands), Johor FA (Malaysia) and Singapore's Geylang United.

In the 1992 Olympic Games he was part of the Australian Olyroos squad, playing in every game en route to a single goal loss to Ghana in the bronze medal playoff.

Post-athletic career 
After retiring from playing, Blagojevic moved into coaching at Bonnyrigg White Eagles before taking up a position with the Blacktown City Demons for the 2005–2006 New South Wales Premier League season.

Blagojevic is currently the manager at Sydney Olympic Football Club, after taking over from Manny Spanoudakis, who was appointed as the club's technical director. During the 2008 season, Blagojevic lead Sydney Olympic to success in the Johnny Warren Cup and lead them to the final of the Tiger Turf Cup.

In 2006, he was an assistant coach on the first series of the Australian television series Nerds FC.

Notes

External links 
 OzFootball profile
 

1969 births
Living people
Australian soccer players
Soccer players from Sydney
Olympic soccer players of Australia
National Soccer League (Australia) players
Eredivisie players
Bonnyrigg White Eagles FC players
Beerschot A.C. players
SC Heerenveen players
Sydney Olympic FC players
Parramatta Power players
Expatriate footballers in Malaysia
Expatriate footballers in the Netherlands
Australian expatriate sportspeople in Malaysia
Australian expatriate sportspeople in the Netherlands
Sydney Olympic FC managers
Association football defenders
Bonnyrigg White Eagles FC managers
Australian soccer coaches
Australian people of Serbian descent
Australian expatriate soccer players
Australia international soccer players
Footballers at the 1992 Summer Olympics
1996 OFC Nations Cup players
2002 OFC Nations Cup players